Rob "Blasko" Nicholson (born November 24, 1969) is an American bassist. He performed on Rob Zombie's solo albums and is currently part of Ozzy Osbourne's band. He is also noted for his contribution as bassist to metal band Cryptic Slaughter within underground metal circles.

Career

Cryptic Slaughter (1984–1988)

Nicholson began his career playing bass for the Santa Monica, California-based speed/thrash metal band Cryptic Slaughter, performing on several of their albums.

Drown (1993–1994)
Formed in 1987 by vocalist Lauren Boquette under the name Yesterday's Tear, Drown was rounded out by Nicholson (bass), Joseph Bishara (guitars/keyboards), and Todd Allen (drums).

Suffer (1995–1996)
Suffer was formed by bassist Bruce Albertson with Nicholson after leaving Drown, switching from bass to lead vocals and guitar. The lineup also featured from Drown drummer Todd Allen. Todd Allen was invited to play drums by Bruce when Johnny Hill of Funhouse left. Suffer managed to score a deal with Walt Disney Music and used the money to finance a seven-song EP, "Heads You Lose, Tails I Win", but broke up shortly after the release.

Killing Spree (1997)
Nicholson was invited to contribute lead vocals on the band's debut release, "Terror From Beyond Space", issued by Napalm Records in 1997. Killing Spree was founded by former Sickening Gore members Jerry McKenzie (guitar) and Chris Huwiler (drums), and also featured Trebor Dunn (programming) and future Body Count bassist Vince Dennis a.k.a. Vincent Price, although bass on the album is credited to Elrich Von Vader. The band never performed live.

Danzig (1997–1998)
Nicholson joined the band Danzig in September 1997, but, like his last band, he did not appear on any of their albums. He departed from the band in April 1998.

Rob Zombie (1998–2006)
Nicholson toured with Rob Zombie, where he began using the nickname "Blasko". He went on to play on three of Rob Zombie's solo albums (Hellbilly Deluxe, The Sinister Urge, & Educated Horses).

The Death Riders (2005)
While with Rob Zombie, Nicholson spent some time to work on a side project with the founder of Coffin Case, Jonny Coffin. The band was composed of Coffin on lead guitar, Daniel Gray on rhythm guitar and lead vocals, DC on drums, and Nicholson on bass. Their debut album, The Soundtrack to Depression, was released via the label Horror High.

Ozzy Osbourne (2003–current)

In 2003, Nicholson replaced Jason Newsted as Ozzy Osbourne's bassist. After Osbourne's band rehearsed for a fall tour, Osbourne was injured in a bad ATV accident in October 2003; the fall tour was cancelled. After Osbourne's recovery, Nicholson performed with Black Sabbath on Ozzfest 2004, and with Osbourne on select dates for Ozzfest 2006. Nicholson officially marked his membership in Osbourne's band when he was featured as the bassist on Osbourne's 10th studio album Black Rain, which was released on May 22, 2007. Since then, Nicholson has played for Osbourne on all live shows including Ozzfest tours, and notably on an American tour with Rob Zombie. He followed that up with Osbourne's 11th studio album, Scream, released in 2010.

Influences

His influences include heavy metal bands Iron Maiden, Motörhead, and Corrosion of Conformity.

Side projects

Zakk Sabbath
Zakk Sabbath is a Black Sabbath tribute band fronted by Zakk Wylde.

Film
Nicholson worked on the 2008 film Repo! The Genetic Opera, performing on the soundtrack.

Management
Nicholson is currently the band manager of Black Veil Brides and also produced their album We Stitch These Wounds. He is the former manager of In This Moment.

Discography

with Cryptic Slaughter
1986: Convicted
1987: Money Talks
1988: Stream of Consciousness

with Drown
1994: Hold On to the Hollow

with Suffer
1996: Heads I Win, Tails You Lose EP

with Killing Spree
1997: Terror from Beyond Space

with Rob Zombie
1998: Hellbilly Deluxe
1999: American Made Music to Strip By
2001: The Sinister Urge
2006: Educated Horses

with The Death Riders
2005: Soundtrack for Depression
TBA: And Then Came the Rain...

with Ozzy Osbourne
2007: Black Rain
2010: Scream

Guest work
2008: Repo! The Genetic Opera (soundtrack)

American heavy metal bass guitarists
American male bass guitarists
The Ozzy Osbourne Band members
White Zombie (band) members
Danzig (band) members
Living people
1969 births
20th-century American guitarists
Prong (band) members